Rein Suurkask (born 25 May 1968 in Mustvee) is an Estonian politician. He has been member of XIV Riigikogu.

Since 2014 he is a member of Estonian Conservative People's Party.

Since 2017 he is a member of Viljandi City Council.

References

Living people
1968 births
Conservative People's Party of Estonia politicians
Members of the Riigikogu, 2019–2023
People from Mustvee Parish